The 2010 FIFA Club World Cup (officially known as the FIFA Club World Cup UAE 2010 presented by Toyota for sponsorship reasons) was a football tournament that was played from 8 to 18 December 2010. It was the seventh FIFA Club World Cup and was hosted by the United Arab Emirates.

Defending champions Barcelona did not qualify as they were eliminated in the semi-finals of the 2009–10 UEFA Champions League by eventual champions Internazionale. African representatives TP Mazembe of DR Congo defeated South America's Internacional of Brazil in the semi-finals to become the first team from outside Europe or South America to reach a Club World Cup final. However, Mazembe were unable to pass the final hurdle, as they lost 3–0 to Internazionale in the final. It was Inter's third world title, having won the Club World Cup's predecessor – the Intercontinental Cup – in 1964 and 1965.

Host bids
The FIFA Executive Committee appointed the United Arab Emirates as hosts for the 2009 and 2010 tournaments on 27 May 2008 during their meeting in Sydney, Australia. Other countries that placed bids were Australia and Japan. Portugal had initially placed a bid, but later withdrew from the process.

Qualified teams

Internacional were the first previous winners to participate in another season of the Club World Cup.

Match officials

Squads

Venues
Abu Dhabi was the only city to serve as a venue for the 2010 FIFA Club World Cup.

Matches 
A draw was held on 27 October 2010 at the FIFA Headquarters in Zürich, Switzerland to decide the matchups for the two quarter-finals.

If a match was tied after normal playing time, 30 minutes of extra time would be played. If still tied after extra time, a penalty shootout would be held to determine the winner. However, for the fifth-place and third-place matches, no extra time would be played, and if tied the match would go straight to a penalty shootout to determine the winner.

All times are local, GST (UTC+4).

Play-off for quarter-finals

Quarter-finals

Semi-finals

Match for fifth place

Match for third place

Final

Goalscorers

Awards

References

External links
FIFA Club World Cup UAE 2010, FIFA.com
2010 FIFA Club World Cup Official Site (Archived)
FIFA Technical Report

 
2010
2010
2010 in association football
2010–11 in Emirati football
2010–11 in Italian football
2010 in South Korean football
2010 in Brazilian football
Foo
2010 in Papua New Guinean sport
2010–11 in Mexican football